Zinc finger BED domain-containing protein 1 is a protein that in humans is encoded by the ZBED1 gene.

ZBED1 regulates the expression of several genes involved in cell proliferation, color remodeling, protein metabolism, and other genes involved in cell proliferation and differentiation.

References

Further reading